|}

The Galtres Stakes is a Listed flat horse race in Great Britain open to fillies and mares aged three years or older. It is run at York over a distance of 1 mile 3 furlongs  and 188 yards (2,385 metres), and it is scheduled to take place each year in August. Since 2014 the race has carried the name of Sir Henry Cecil, a former British flat racing Champion Trainer who died in 2013. It is currently held on the second day of York's four-day Ebor Festival meeting.

Records
Most successful horse since 1988:
 no horse has won this race more than once

Leading jockey since 1988 (7 wins):
 Frankie Dettori – Madiriya (1990), Nibbs Point (1991), Cunning (1992), Mezzo Soprano (2003), Our Obsession (2013), Martlet (2015), Lah Ti Dar (2018)

Leading trainer since 1988 (8 wins):
 Luca Cumani – Madiriya (1990), Nibbs Point (1991), Cunning (1992), Kithanga (1993), Noble Rose (1994), Larrocha (1995), Kaliana (1997), Innuendo (1999)

Winners since 1988

See also
 Horse racing in Great Britain
 List of British flat horse races

References
 Paris-Turf: 
 Racing Post:

Flat races in Great Britain
York Racecourse
Long-distance horse races for fillies and mares